Vadym Yuriyovych Alpatov (born 22 April 1980) is a Ukrainian former football player.

References

1980 births
Living people
Ukrainian footballers
FC Lokomotiv Nizhny Novgorod players
Russian Premier League players
Ukrainian expatriate footballers
Expatriate footballers in Russia
MFC Mykolaiv players
FC Okzhetpes players
Expatriate footballers in Kazakhstan

Association football midfielders